The Sandal Bar is a region between the rivers Chenab and Ravi in Punjab, Pakistan. It is located in the southern part of Rechna Doab. "Bar", in the local language, means a forested area where there are no resources for cultivation, like water. This Bar is named after Saandal, thought to be the grandfather of the legendary Punjabi hero, Dulla Bhatti. Almost all the area of this bar used to be part Jhang District, but nowadays it is divided between the districts of Faisalabad, Jhang and Toba Tek Singh.

Sandal Bar was actually a vast area with a number of Punjabi tribes sharing the same culture and language, and are related by blood. Nowadays Sandal Bar falls within Jhang, Tandlianwala, jaranwala, Pir Mahal, Some parts of Pindi bhattian, villages of Chiniot and 1% area  of Sheikhupura. The Sandal Bar is known for the sammi and jhumar form of music and dance. It was ruled by Mehr Humayun Bharwana for a long period. This area was not under the British rule, but was a Princely State.

References 

Regions of Punjab, Pakistan